The Righteous Brothers are an American musical duo originally formed by Bill Medley and Bobby Hatfield but now comprising Medley and Bucky Heard. Medley formed the group with Hatfield in 1963. They had first performed together in 1962 in the Los Angeles area as part of a five-member group called the Paramours, and adopted the name The Righteous Brothers when they became a duo. Their most active recording period was in the 1960s and '70s, and, after several years inactive as a duo, Hatfield and Medley reunited in 1981 and continued to perform until Hatfield's death in 2003. The music they performed is sometimes dubbed "blue-eyed soul".

Hatfield and Medley had contrasting vocal ranges, which helped them create a distinctive sound as a duet. They each had the vocal talent to perform as soloists. Medley sang the low parts with his bass-baritone voice, with Hatfield taking the higher-register vocals with his tenor. His voice reached the register of a countertenor.

Following a year and a half of Top 40 non-entries on [[Billboard Hot 100|Billboards Hot 100]], the duo hit big with the late-1964 release of what would become their signature record, "You've Lost That Lovin' Feelin'" – a transatlantic number one produced by Phil Spector, often considered one of his finest works and a landmark recording in popular music. Other notable hits include three US 1965 Top Tens – "Just Once in My Life" and covers of "Unchained Melody" (also a huge hit in 1990 after being featured in the film Ghost) and "Ebb Tide" – and the massive US 1966 number one "(You're My) Soul and Inspiration", plus the 1974 comeback hit "Rock and Roll Heaven". Both Hatfield and Medley also had for a time their own solo careers. In 2016, Medley re-formed The Righteous Brothers with Bucky Heard and they continue to perform as a duo.

The Righteous Brothers were inducted into the Rock and Roll Hall of Fame in 2003 and into the Vocal Group Hall of Fame in 2005. Rolling Stone ranked them no. 16 on its list of the 20 Greatest Duos of All Time.

Music career
1962–1964: Beginning
Bobby Hatfield and Bill Medley were in different groups before they met – Hatfield was in a group from Anaheim called the Variations, and Medley in a group from Santa Ana called the Paramours. Barry Rillera, a member of Medley's band who was also in Hatfield's group, suggested they go see each other's show and perform together. Later, after a member of Paramours left in 1962, Hatfield and Medley joined forces and formed a new Paramours, which included Johnny Wimber (a founder of the Vineyard Movement). They started performing at a club called John's Black Derby in Santa Ana, and were signed to a small record label Moonglow in 1962. They released a single "There She Goes (She's Walking Away)" in December 1962. However, the Paramours did not have much success and soon broke up, leaving Hatfield and Medley to perform as a duo in 1963. According to Medley, they then adopted the name The Righteous Brothers for the duo because black Marines from the El Toro Marine base started calling them "righteous brothers". At the end of a performance, a black U.S. Marine in the audience would shout, "That was righteous, brothers!", and would greet them with "Hey righteous brothers, how you doin'?" on meeting them.

The Righteous Brothers released three albums under the Moonglow label, one of these and a further compilation album were released after they had joined Phil Spector. They released 12 singles with Moonglow, but only two were moderate hits – "Little Latin Lupe Lu" and "My Babe" from their first album Right Now!. In August and September 1964, they opened for The Beatles in their first U.S. tour. However, they left before the tour finished as they were asked to appear on a new television show called Shindig!; they also felt unappreciated by the audience as they were then little known on the East Coast, and the audience demanded to hear the Beatles while they were performing. They returned to Los Angeles to tape the pilot for the show, and would later appear in the show regularly. Their next album was Some Blue-Eyed Soul; the term blue-eyed soul was first used to refer to The Righteous Brothers by black DJs, but after they became popular, the term became a general term for all white singers who sang what was then considered "black music".  In October and November 1964, they opened for The Rolling Stones on their American tour.

1964–1965: The Spector years
In 1964, music producer Phil Spector came across the Righteous Brothers when they performed in a show at the Cow Palace in Daly City, where one of Spector's acts, The Ronettes, was also appearing, and he conducted the band for the show. Spector was impressed enough to arrange a deal with Moonglow in early October 1964 allowing him to record and release songs by the Righteous Brothers in the US, Canada and UK under his own label, Philles Records. Prior to this, all the songs Spector produced for Philles Records featured African-American singers; the Righteous Brothers would be his first white vocal group for the label. However, their "blue-eyed soul" vocal style suited Spector.

Spector commissioned Barry Mann and Cynthia Weil to write a song for them, which turned out to be "You've Lost That Lovin' Feelin'". The song, released in late 1964, became their first major hit single and reached No. 1 in February 1965.  Produced by Phil Spector, the record is often cited as one of the finest expressions of Spector's Wall of Sound production techniques. It is one of the most successful pop singles of its time, despite exceeding the then-standard length for radio play. Indeed, according to BMI, "You've Lost That Lovin' Feelin'" became the most-played song on American radio and television of the 20th century, with more than eight million airplays by the end of 1999.

The Righteous Brothers had several other hit singles with Philles Records in 1965, including "Just Once in My Life" and "Unchained Melody" (originally the B-side of "Hung on You"), both reaching the Billboard Top 10. Medley said that he produced "Unchained Melody"; the song was originally intended only as a track on the album Just Once in My Life, and Spector had asked him to produce the albums so Spector could spend time and money on producing singles. Later copies of the original 45 release credited Spector as producer when it became a hit.

After the success of "Unchained Melody", Spector started releasing older songs with the Righteous Brothers, including "Ebb Tide", which reached No. 5. Hatfield was the only vocal on "Unchained Melody" and "Ebb Tide", and both were songs Bobby Hatfield had performed with his first group, the Variations. According to Medley, both the early singles "You've Lost That Lovin' Feelin'" and "Just Once in My Life" featured Medley's vocal strongly, which caused some friction between the duo, and the Hatfield solos in later singles restored some balance between the two. The last single released that they recorded with Philles Records was "The White Cliffs of Dover". Although Spector focused his attention in producing singles, a number of albums by the Righteous Brothers released with Philles Records sold well.

In 1965, they had a couple of guest appearances in the films A Swingin' Summer and Beach Ball. They also became the first rock and roll act to play the Strip in Las Vegas (at The Sands).

1966–1967: Verve Records
The duo's relationship with Spector however ended in some acrimony; in 1966 they signed with Verve/MGM Records, leading to a lawsuit from Spector, which MGM settled with a $600,000 payment to Spector. Their next release in 1966, "(You're My) Soul and Inspiration" was a Phil Spector sound-alike song. The song was first written by Mann and Weil after the success of "Lovin' Feelin'" but not completed, and they finished the song following a request by Medley after the Righteous Brothers moved to Verve. Medley then produced the completed song, and was able to fully simulate the Spector style of production and achieve a similar sound to that of "Lovin' Feelin'". It quickly became their second No. 1 U.S. hit, staying at the top for three weeks.

After a few more top-40 hits, including "He" and "Go Ahead And Cry", their popularity began to decline. Even a collaboration with former Motown A&R chief William "Mickey" Stevenson failed to work. In 1967, before they went their separate ways, and, to capitalize on their previous hits, Verve/MGM issued a "Greatest Hits" compilation which has been modified twice: in 1983 with 10 tracks and in 1990 with two more tracks.

1968–1975: Break up and reunion
The duo split up in February 1968, a breakup that would last for more than six years, when Medley left to pursue a solo career. Medley recorded a few solo recordings on several labels, while Hatfield teamed up with singer Jimmy Walker (from The Knickerbockers) using the Righteous Brothers name on the MGM label. Medley first recorded "I Can't Make It Alone" written by Carole King, but the song failed to make much of an impact. The following single, "Brown Eyed Woman" written by Mann and Weil, performed better. However, neither he nor Hatfield was able to match their previous chart success.

Hatfield and Jimmy Walker recorded an album, Re-Birth, as The Righteous Brothers before disbanding in 1971. In a 2013 interview, Jimmy Walker said he had wanted to continue, but Hatfield decided to take a break and broke up the act. In 1969, Hatfield appeared in a TV movie, The Ballad of Andy Crocker, and also recorded "Only You". He released a solo album, Messin' In Muscle Shoals in 1971.

According to Medley, he was performing three shows a night in Las Vegas, but finding it too much of a strain on his voice singing solo, and under advice he sought out Hatfield to reform The Righteous Brothers; Hatfield at this point was broke and living alone in a small apartment. In 1974, Medley and Hatfield announced their reunion at an appearance on The Sonny & Cher Comedy Hour. They signed with Haven Records, run by producers Dennis Lambert and Brian Potter and distributed by Capitol Records. Within a few weeks of reforming, they recorded Alan O'Day's "Rock and Roll Heaven", a paean to several deceased rock singers which became a hit, peaking at No. 3 on the Billboard Hot 100. Several more minor hits on Haven followed. After 1975, however, the Righteous Brothers would not appear in music charts except for re-releases of older songs and compilation albums, some of which were re-recordings of earlier works.

1976–2003: Later career and solo works
Between 1976 and 1981, Hatfield and Medley stopped performing as a duo after the death of Medley's first wife, as he wanted time off to look after his son. They reunited for an anniversary special on American Bandstand in 1981 to perform an updated version of "Rock And Roll Heaven". They resumed touring intermittently, and they recorded a 21st Anniversary Celebration concert in 1983 at the Roxy on the Sunset Strip in Los Angeles, which was later released on video and was also aired on television.

In the late 1970s, Medley once again began to record as a solo artist and had some success in the 1980s. In 1984, he scored country hits with "Till Your Memory's Gone" and "I Still Do", the latter also an adult-contemporary crossover hit. In late 1987, his duet with Jennifer Warnes, "(I've Had) The Time of My Life", which appeared on the soundtrack for Dirty Dancing, topped the Billboard Hot 100. It won them a Grammy Award for Best Pop Performance by a Duo or Group with Vocals.

In 1990, Bobby Hatfield's original recording of "Unchained Melody" was featured in the popular feature film Ghost, starring Patrick Swayze and Demi Moore. It triggered an avalanche of requests to Top 40 radio stations by fans who had seen the movie to play the 1965 Righteous Brothers' recording. This motivated Polygram (which now owned the Verve/MGM label archives) to re-release the song to Top 40 radio. It became a major hit for a second time, reaching No. 13 on the Hot 100 in 1990. It also became their second No. 1 in the UK. The duo quickly re-recorded another version of "Unchained Melody" for Curb Records. Both the reissued and the re-recorded songs charted at the same time for several weeks, and the Righteous Brothers made history as the first act to have two versions of the same song in the Top 20 at the same time. The re-recorded "Unchained Melody" hit No. 19 on the Hot 100 and was certified platinum by the Recording Industry Association of America (RIAA).

They also re-recorded other songs for a budget-priced CD, The Best of The Righteous Brothers, released by Curb Records. Medley would later describe the re-recordings as "artistically, a stupid idea; financially, a wonderfully idea". The album sold very well and received a double platinum certification from the RIAA. A greatest hits CD collection of the original recordings called The Very Best of The Righteous Brothers...Unchained Melody was released later by Verve/Polydor. This compilation album also became their first entry in the UK album chart. They began to tour extensively all through the 1990s and early 2000s and performed for about 12 weeks a year in Las Vegas.

Hatfield's death
Bobby Hatfield was found dead in his hotel room in Kalamazoo, Michigan, on November 5, 2003, shortly before he was due to perform at a concert with Bill Medley at Western Michigan University's Miller Auditorium. The autopsy report attributed his death to heart failure brought on by cocaine. Bill Medley continued to perform as a solo artist for some time after Hatfield's death, occasionally singing with a screen projection of old film footage of Hatfield.

2016: The Righteous Brothers revived
In January 2016, Medley announced he intended to revive the Righteous Brothers for the first time since 2003. The late Hatfield was replaced with singer Bucky Heard at Las Vegas's Harrah's Showroom for more than 40 shows from March 23, 2016, to November 8. The repertoire included some of the Righteous Brothers' best-known songs, such as "You've Lost That Lovin' Feelin'," "Soul & Inspiration," "Unchained Melody", but also the later "Rock and Roll Heaven", as well as Bill Medley's "The Time of My Life". Medley explained that it was the encouragement of the Righteous Brothers’ fans as well as several friends, producers and contacts in Las Vegas that made him consider reviving the Righteous Brothers' name again, while acknowledging that it was a difficult choice to continue without Hatfield, saying “I’ve had a million fans hollering at me to keep the Righteous Brothers alive... I looked at a couple of guys, but you know, you can’t replace Bobby Hatfield, he’s the best in the world”. Medley was previously acquainted with Heard and watched him perform at a tribute concert to Journey, after which he realized that Heard was the only one he would consider capable of filling Hatfield's shoes, also noting that he and Heard had good chemistry together. Medley approached Heard a few days later and discussed the matter, which ended in a coin toss, which Medley won, resulting in Heard accepting Medley's proposal. Heard has since communicated that he knows he can never replace Hatfield, nor will he attempt to do so and that he intends to sing like Hatfield rather than sound like him. A new CD was released the same year, featuring several of the Righteous Brothers' hit singles sung by Medley and Heard.

Awards and nominations
The Righteous Brothers were nominated twice for a Grammy. In 1965, their recording of "You've Lost That Lovin' Feelin" was nominated in the Best Rock And Roll Recording category at the 7th Annual Grammy Awards. Their re-recording of "Unchained Melody" was nominated for Best Pop Vocal Performance by a Duo or Group at the 1991 Grammy. They were also awarded the Best New Singing Group in the Billboard Disc Jockey Poll in 1965.

The Righteous Brothers were inducted into the Rock and Roll Hall of Fame on March 10, 2003. They were inducted into the Vocal Group Hall of Fame in 2005.

MembersCurrent members Bill Medley (1962–1968, 1974–1976, 1981–2003, 2016–present)
 Bucky Heard (2016–present)Former members Bobby Hatfield (1962–1971, 1974–1976, 1981–2003; died 2003)
 Jimmy Walker (1968–1971; died 2020)

Timeline

Discography
For their discography as solo artists, see Bill Medley and Bobby Hatfield.

Albums
{| class="wikitable plainrowheaders" style="text-align:center;"
|-
! scope="col" rowspan="2" style="width:12em;"| Title
! scope="col" rowspan="2" style="width:18em;"| Album details
! scope="col" colspan="4"| Peak chart positions
! scope="col" rowspan="2" style="width:9em;"| Certifications
|-
! scope="col" style="width:3em;font-size:85%;"| US
! scope="col" style="width:3em;font-size:85%;"| USR&B
! scope="col" style="width:3em;font-size:85%;"| AUS
! scope="col" style="width:3em;font-size:85%;"| CAN
|-
! scope="row"| Right Now!
|
 Released: 1963
 Label: Moonglow Records
 Formats: Vinyl
|  11 || 8 || — || —
|
|-
! scope="row"| Some Blue-Eyed Soul
|
 Released: 1964
 Label: Moonglow Records
 Formats: Vinyl
|  14 || — || — || —
|
|-
! scope="row"| This Is New!
|
 Released: 1965
 Label: Moonglow Records
 Formats: Vinyl
|  39 || — || — || —
|
|-
! scope="row"| You've Lost That Lovin' Feelin'''
|
 Released: 1965
 Label: Philles Records 
 Formats: Vinyl
|  4 || 3 || — || —
|
|-
! scope="row"| Just Once in My Life...|
 Released: 1965
 Label: Philles Records 
 Formats: Vinyl
|  9 || 8 || — || —
|
|-
! scope="row"| Back to Back|
 Released: 1965
 Label: Philles Records 
 Formats: Vinyl
|  16 || — || — || —
|
|-
! scope="row"| Soul & Inspiration|
 Released: 1966
 Label: Verve Records 
 Formats: Vinyl
|  7 || 18 || — || —
|
US: Gold
|-
! scope="row"| Go Ahead and Cry|
 Released: 1966
 Label: Verve Records 
 Formats: Vinyl
|  32 || — || — || —
|
|-
! scope="row"| Sayin' Somethin
|
 Released: 1967
 Label: Verve Records 
 Formats: Vinyl
|  155 || — || — || —
|
|-
! scope="row"| Souled Out|
 Released: 1967
 Label: Verve Records 
 Formats: Vinyl
|  198 || — || — || —
|
|-
! scope="row"| One for the Road|
 Released: 1968
 Label: Verve Records 
 Formats: Vinyl
|  187 || — || — || —
|
|-
! scope="row"| Re-Birth(Bobby Hatfield and Jimmy Walker)
|
 Released: 1969
 Label: Verve Records 
 Formats: Vinyl
|  — || — || — || —
|
|-
! scope="row"| Give It to the People|
 Released: 1974
 Label: Haven Records
 Formats: Vinyl
| 27 || — || 83 || 27
|
|-
! scope="row"| Sons of Mrs. Righteous|
 Released: 1975
 Label: Haven Records 
 Formats: Vinyl
|  — || — || — || —
|
|-
! scope="row"| The Righteous Brothers(Bill Medley and Bucky Heard)
|
 Released: 2016
 Label: Rock Canyon Records
 Formats: Digital, CD
|  — || — || — || —
|
|-
| colspan="8" style="font-size:9pt"| "—" denotes releases that did not chart or were not released to that country
|}

Compilation albums
Many compilation albums by The Righteous Brothers have been released, the following is a selection of compilation albums that received certifications.
{| class="wikitable plainrowheaders" style="text-align:center;"
|-
! scope="col" rowspan="2" style="width:12em;"| Title
! scope="col" rowspan="2" style="width:18em;"| Album details
! scope="col" colspan="6"| Peak chart positions
! scope="col" rowspan="2" style="width:10em;"| Certifications
|-
! scope="col" style="width:3em;font-size:85%;"| US
! scope="col" style="width:3em;font-size:85%;"| US Catalog
! scope="col" style="width:3em;font-size:85%;"| AUS
! scope="col" style="width:3em;font-size:85%;"| UK
! scope="col" style="width:3em;font-size:85%;"| CAN
! scope="col" style="width:3em;font-size:85%;"| NLD
|-
! scope="row"| The Righteous Brothers Greatest Hits|
 Released: November 30, 1967 (also reissued later on CD with more tracks)
 Label: Verve Records
 Formats: Vinyl, CD
| 21 || — || — || — || 10 || 58 
|
 Can: Gold
 US: Gold
|-
! scope="row"| Greatest Hits Vol. 2|
 Released: 1969
 Label: Verve Records
 Formats: Vinyl, cassette, CD, digital download
| 126 || — || — || — || — || —
|
|-
! scope="row"| You've Love That Lovin' Feelin|
 Released: 1982 (AUS)
 Label: J&B Records (JB 098)
 Formats: Vinyl, cassette
| — || — || 40 || — || — || —
|
|-
! scope="row"| Soul & Inspiration
|
 Released: 1987 (AUS)
 Label: J&B Records (JB 323)
 Formats: Vinyl, cassette
| — || — || 98 || — || — || —
|
|-
! scope="row"| The Anthology 1962–1974
|
 Released: July 26, 1989
 Label: Rhino Records
 Formats: Vinyl, cassette, CD, digital download
| 178 || — || — || — || — || —
|
 US: Gold
|-
! scope="row"| Unchained Melody – Best Of The Righteous Brothers
|
 Released: October 2, 1990
 Label: Curb Records
 Formats: Cassette, CD, digital download
| 161 || 1 || 5 || — || — || —
|
 AUS: Platinum
 CAN: Platinum
 US: 2× Platinum
|-
! scope="row"| The Very Best Of Righteous Brothers
|
 Released: 1990
 Label: Polydor (Verve)
 Formats: Vinyl, Cassette, CD, digital download
| 31 || 14 || 38 || 3 || — || —
|
 AUS: Platinum
 UK: Platinum
 US: Gold
|-
| colspan="12" style="font-size:9pt"| "—" denotes releases that did not chart or were not released to that country
|}

Singles
{| class="wikitable" style=text-align:center; 
!rowspan=2|Year
!rowspan=2|Titles (A-side, B-side)Both sides from same album except where indicated
!colspan=4|Peak chart positions
! scope="col" rowspan="2" style="width:7em;"| Certifications
!rowspan=2|Album
|-style="font-size:smaller;"
!width=30| US
!width=30| UK
!width=30| CAN

!width=30| NLD
|-
|rowspan=3| 1963
|align=left| "Little Latin Lupe Lu"b/w "I'm So Lonely"
| 49
| —
| —
| —
|
|align="left" rowspan="3"|Right Now!
|-
|align=left| "My Babe"b/w "Fee-Fi-Fidily-I-O"
| 75
| —
| —
| —
|
|-
|align=left| "Koko Joe"b/w "B-Flat Blues"
| —
| —
| —
| —
|
|-
| rowspan="4"|1964
|align=left| "Try to Find Another Man"b/w "I Still Love You" (from This Is New!)
| —
| —
| —
| —
|
|align="left" rowspan="3"|Some Blue-Eyed Soul
|-
|align=left| "Bring Your Love to Me"b/w "If You're Lying, You'll Be Crying" (from This Is New!)
| —
| —
| —
| —
|
|-
|align=left| "This Little Girl of Mine"b/w "If You're Lying, You'll Be Crying" (from This Is New!)
| —
| —
| —
| —
|
|-
|align=left| "You've Lost That Lovin' Feelin'"b/w "There's a Woman"
| 1
| 1
| 1
| 8
|
 UK: Silver
|align="left"|You've Lost That Lovin' Feelin
|-
|rowspan=7| 1965
|align=left| "Bring Your Love to Me" /"Fannie Mae"
| 83117
| —
| —
| —
|
|align="left"|Some Blue-Eyed Soul
|-
|align=left| "Just Once in My Life"b/w "The Blues"
| 9
| —
| 6
| —
|
|align="left"|Just Once in My Life
|-
|align=left| "You Can Have Her"b/w "Love or Magic" (from Right Now!)
| 67
| —
| 17
| —
|
|align="left" rowspan="2"|This Is New!
|-
|align=left| "Justine"b/w "In That Great Gettin' Up Mornin'" (from Right Now!)
| 85
| —
| 37
| —
|
|-
|align=left| "Unchained Melody" /"Hung on You" (from Back To Back)
| 447
| 14 —
| 9 —
| 8 —
|
|align="left"|Just Once In My Life
|-
|align=left| "For Your Love"b/w "Gotta Tell You How I Feel" (from This Is New!)
| —
| —
| —
| —
|
|align="left"|Some Blue-Eyed Soul
|-
|align=left| "Ebb Tide"b/w "(I Love You) For Sentimental Reasons"
| 5
| 48
| 5
| —
|
|align="left"|Back To Back
|-
|rowspan=8| 1966
|align=left| "Georgia on My Mind"b/w "My Tears Will Go Away" (from Some Blue-Eyed Soul)
| 62
| —
| —
| —
|
|align="left"|Right Now!
|-
|align=left| "(You're My) Soul and Inspiration"b/w "B-Side Blues" (Non-album track)
| 1
| 15
| 2
| — 
|
US: Gold
|align="left" rowspan="2"|Soul & Inspiration
|-
|align=left| "He" /"He Will Break Your Heart"
| 1891
| — —
| 17 —
| —
|
|-
|align=left| "Bring Your Love to Me" (second reissue)b/w "I Need a Girl" (from This Is New!)
| —
| —
| —
| —
|
|align="left"|Some Blue-Eyed Soul
|-
|align=left| "Go Ahead and Cry"b/w "Things Didn't Go Your Way"
| 30
| —
| 27
| —
|
|align="left"|Go Ahead and Cry
|-
|align=left| "On This Side of Goodbye"b/w "A Man Without a Dream"
| 47
| —
| 42
| —
|
|align="left"|Sayin' Somethin
|-
|align=left| "The White Cliffs of Dover"b/w "She's Mine, All Mine"
| —
| 21
| —
| —
|
|align="left"|Back To Back
|-
|align=left| "Island in the Sun"b/w "What Now My Love"
| —
| 24
| —
| —
|
|align="left"|Go Ahead and Cry
|-
|rowspan=4| 1967
|align=left| "Along Came Jones"b/w "Jimmy's Blues"
| —
| —
| —
| —
|
|align="left"|''Sayin' Somethin
|-
|align=left| "Melancholy Music Man"b/w "Don't Give Up on Me"
| 43
| —
| —
| —
|
|align="left"|Non-album tracks
|-
|align=left| "Stranded in the Middle of No Place"b/w "Been So Nice"
| 72128
| —
| —
| —
|
|align="left"|Souled Out
|-
|align=left| "My Darling Clementine"b/w "That Lucky Old Sun"Unreleased single
| —
| —
| —
| —
|
|align="left"|Standards
|-
| 1968
|align=left| "Here I Am"b/w "So Many Lonely Nights Ahead"
| —
| —
| —
| —
|
|align="left"|Souled Out
|-
| 1969
|align=left| "You've Lost That Lovin' Feelin'"b/w "Let the Good Times Roll" (from The Righteous Brothers Greatest Hits, Vol. 2)UK reissue
| —
| 10
| —
| —
|
|align="left"|The Righteous Brothers Greatest Hits
|}

Notes

note a"My Babe" re-charted in 1965 at No. 101 U.S.
note b"Bring Your Love to Me"/"Fannie Mae," "You Can Have Her," "Justine" and "Georgia on My Mind" were older recordings released as singles in the U.S. by the Moonglow label to cash in on the duo's success on Philles (1964–65) and Verve (1966–67), which explains their relatively low chart positions.
note cThe 1990 re-issue of "Unchained Melody" also charted at No. 1 on the Billboard Adult Contemporary chart.
note d Three versions were ranked together as one in the Dutch Top 40 chart – the versions by the Righteous Brothers, Cilla Black, and a local cover by Trea Dobbs.

References

External links

 – The 1983 recording of their anniversary concert at the Roxy Theatre in Los Angeles
 Righteous Brothers Discography — compiled by Peter Richmond
  Righteous Brothers — by Dr. Frank Hoffmann

American pop music groups
American musical duos
American vocal groups
American soul musical groups
Sue Records artists
Musical groups established in 1962
Musical groups disestablished in 2003
Philles Records artists
Musical groups reestablished in 2016
1962 establishments in California